Roland Davis may refer to:
Roland Clark Davis (1902–1961), American psychologist
Roland Davis, musician in Amington Band
Roland Davis, character in Almost Normal

See also
Roland Davies (disambiguation)